Senator Haley may refer to:

David Haley (born 1958), Kansas State Senate
Elisha Haley (1776–1860), Connecticut State Senate
George W. Haley (1925–2015), Kansas State Senate
Ted Haley (1920–2017), Washington State Senate

See also
Senator Haile (disambiguation)
Senator Hailey (disambiguation)
Senator Hale (disambiguation)
Senator Hawley (disambiguation)